Darren Connell (born 3 February 1982) is an English former professional footballer who played as a striker. He played in the Football League with Blackpool and Macclesfield Town

Connell has found his football career reinvigorated in his twilight years with Merseyside Christian League side St Cuthberts. He scored the winning goal in their 2013 National Trophy Final victory over Battle Baptist of Sussex and was awarded Man Of The Match by Linvoy Primus. Connell was top scorer for St Cuthberts in both league and cup in 2012/13 and is a key force behind their push for further national and league glory for 2013/14.

References

1982 births
Living people
English footballers
Association football forwards
Blackpool F.C. players
Macclesfield Town F.C. players
Scarborough F.C. players
Hucknall Town F.C. players
Barrow A.F.C. players
Accrington Stanley F.C. players
Burscough F.C. players
Grantham Town F.C. players
English Football League players